Hermann Gericke (born 12 August 1931) is a Swiss former swimmer. He competed in the men's 100 metre backstroke at the 1952 Summer Olympics.

References

External links
 

1931 births
Living people
Swiss male backstroke swimmers
Olympic swimmers of Switzerland
Swimmers at the 1952 Summer Olympics
Place of birth missing (living people)